Marie Louise d'Orléans (26 March 1662 – 12 February 1689) was Queen of Spain as the wife of King Charles II. She was born petite-fille de France as the daughter of Duke Philippe I of Orléans and Princess Henrietta of England. Marie became the Queen of Spain on 19 November 1679, and remained in her post until her death in 1689 from the presumed cause of appendicitis.

Life

Childhood 

Marie Louise d'Orléans was born at the Palais Royal in Paris.  She was the eldest daughter of Philippe of France, Duke of Orléans and of his first wife, Princess Henrietta of England.  As a petite-fille de France she was entitled to the attribute of Royal Highness, although, as was customary at court at the palace of Versailles, her style, Mademoiselle d'Orléans, was more often used.
 
Charming, pretty and graceful, Marie Louise, who was her father's favourite child, had a happy childhood, residing most of the time in the Palais Royal, and at the château de Saint-Cloud situated a few kilometres west of Paris. Marie Louise spent a lot of time with both her paternal and maternal grandmothers—Anne of Austria, who doted on her and left the bulk of her fortune to her when she died in 1666; and Henrietta Maria, who lived in Colombes.

Marie Louise's mother died in 1670. The following year, her father married Elisabeth Charlotte of the Palatinate. All her life, Marie Louise would maintain an affectionate correspondence with her stepmother.

Queen
In July 1679, Marie was informed by her father, Philippe, and uncle, King Louis XIV of her betrothal to Charles II of Spain. Distressed by the arranged marriage, Marie spent most of her time weeping, since she had fallen in love with her cousin Louis. The proxy marriage took place at the Palace of Fontainebleau on 30 August 1679; standing for the groom was Mademoiselle d'Orléans' distant cousin Louis Armand de Bourbon, Prince of Conti. Until mid-September there were a series of formal events held in honour of the new Queen of Spain. Marie Louise went to the convent of Val-de-Grâce, before her departure, where the heart of her mother was kept. She would never return to France.

On 19 November 1679, Marie Louise married Charles in person in Quintanapalla, near Burgos, Spain. This was the start of a lonely existence at the Spanish court. Her new husband had fallen in love with her and remained so until the end of his life. However, the confining etiquette of the Spanish Court (e.g., touching the Queen was forbidden) and unsuccessful attempts to bear a child caused her distress. Her most frequent companion was the French ambassadress, Marie Gigault de Bellefonds, the Marquise de Villars.

Unlike the fashionable palaces at Versailles, Saint-Cloud and Paris, her new residences were the forbidding Real Alcázar de Madrid and the even more stark Palacio del Buen Retiro—a country palace where Marie Louise was allowed to stable her French horses. She also spent time in the Palacio Real de Aranjuez, south of Madrid.

After ten years of marriage the couple had no children. Marie Louise confided to the French ambassador, that
she was really not a virgin any longer, but that as far as she could figure things, she believed she would never have children.

During the last years of her life she became overweight. She was reportedly fond of sweetened lemon and cinnamon drinks, the making of which required 32 pounds of sugar.   After horseback riding on 11 February 1689, she felt a severe pain in the abdomen which forced her to lie down the rest of the evening. After doctors found that her condition had become mortal, confessors were called in to save her soul.

On her deathbed, she spoke to her husband the following words:

 Many women may be with His Majesty, but none will love him more as I do 

She died the following night.

Aftermath
The death of Marie Louise left her husband heartbroken. There were rumours that she had been poisoned by the notorious intrigante Olympia Mancini, comtesse de Soissons, at the behest of her mother-in-law, the dowager queen Mariana of Austria, because of Marie Louise's childlessness. Mariana and Marie Louise had, however, not been known to be estranged and the elder queen appeared devastated at the young queen's death. It seems likely that the real cause of Marie Louise's death was appendicitis.

Ancestry

References

Sources

Lurgo, Elisabetta (2021). Marie-Louise d'Orléans. La Princesse oubliée, nièce de Louis XIV. Paris, Perrin.

|-

1662 births
1689 deaths
Royal consorts of Naples
Royal consorts of Sicily
Spanish royal consorts
House of Orléans
House of Bourbon (Spain)
17th-century House of Habsburg
Nobility from Paris
Princesses of France (Bourbon)
16th-century French people
Burials in the Pantheon of Infantes at El Escorial